The  is a Japanese SACLOS guided anti-tank missile that entered service with the JGSDF in 1984. It was initially issued to coastal defence units, intended to destroy troop and vehicle landing ships as they approached the shoreline. It is also known as KAM-9.

Description
The missile is stored in a cylindrical transport container. On launch the missile is ejected from the tube by a solid rocket motor. After traveling a safe distance from the operator, the Daicel flight motor ignites and takes the missile to its cruising speed of approximately 200 meters per second.

The missile is a thin cylinder with two sets of four pop-up fins positioned along the body of the missile. The warhead is either a shaped charge for use against tanks, or a semi-armour piercing fragmentation type with a delayed-action fuze for use against landing vessels.

Operation

The missile is steered in flight by command signals from the launcher transmitted over a guidance wire spooled out behind the missile. A xenon lamp on the rear of the missile allows the NEC manufactured launcher sight unit to compute an offset between the missile position and line of sight to the target, and calculate steering corrections based on this offset.

The Type 79 missile can be fired remotely, at a distance of up to fifty meters from the tripod mounted guidance system. It can be mounted on a Mitsubishi Type 73 jeep, similar to the Type 64 MAT and the Type 87 Chu-MAT. The Type 79 is also in use with the Mitsubishi Type 89 IFV.

See also
 Type 64 MAT
 Type 87 Chu-MAT
 Type 01 LMAT

References

 
 
 
  Kenkyusha's New Japanese-English Dictionary, Kenkyusha Limited, Tokyo 1991,

External links

 Official JGSDF Page

Anti-tank guided missiles of the Cold War
Anti-tank guided missiles of Japan
Cold War weapons of Japan
Military equipment introduced in the 1980s